Charles John Vaughan (23 April 1921 – 16 March 1989) was an English footballer who played for Charlton Athletic and Portsmouth as a centre forward during the 1940s and 1950s.

Vaughan started his career with Sutton United. He helped them win numerous wartime honours, scored 42 league goals in the 1945–46 season to win the Athenian League, and finished his Sutton United career with 248 goals in 147 competitive appearances. He was inducted into the club's Hall of Fame.

In 1950, Vaughan toured Canada with a Football Association party, and in March 1952, he appeared in an England B international against the Netherlands.

References

External links
Photograph on Charlton Athletic website

1921 births
1989 deaths
Footballers from Bermondsey
Association football forwards
English footballers
England B international footballers
Sutton United F.C. players
Charlton Athletic F.C. players
Portsmouth F.C. players
Bexley United F.C. players
English Football League players